Předměřice nad Jizerou is a municipality and village in Mladá Boleslav District in the Central Bohemian Region of the Czech Republic. It has about 1,000 inhabitants.

Administrative parts
The village of Kačov is an administrative part of Předměřice nad Jizerou.

Geography
It lies in the Jizera Table. The municipality is situated on the left bank of the Jizera River, which forms the northern and western municipal border.

History

The first written mention of Předměřice nad Jizerou is from 1352. For most of its history it was part of the Brandýs estate.

Transport
The D10 motorway passes through the municipality.

Sights
A monument dedicated to the deceased in World War I, "Burial in the Carpathians", is located in the village. It was made by Jan Štursa in 1921.

References

External links

Villages in Mladá Boleslav District